Joseph Bonner, also commonly known by the nickname Spanner Banner, is a Jamaican reggae and dancehall musician.

Biography
Bonner was born on 6 February 1959, in Rock Hall, St. Andrew, Jamaica. The brother of fellow reggae stars Pliers, Richie Spice, and Snatcha Lion, Bonner began his career in the late 1980s on the Bidia sound system in St. Andrew, and had hits with songs such as "Life Goes On" with producer Winston Riley. He co-wrote Chaka Demus and Pliers' chart-topping "Tease Me", and rose to prominence himself in the mid-1990s with albums on RAS (Now and Forever) and Island Jamaica (Chill), working with Sly and Robbie on the latter. He went on to release the Real Love album in 2001 on Heartbeat Records, featuring contributions from Tanya Stephens, Lady Saw, and Sean Paul among others.

After relocating to England for a few years he returned to Jamaica and found success again. In 2009 he returned to the charts with the Donovan Germain-produced "Rolling Stones", and won the 'Biggest Comeback Artiste' award at the 2010 EME Awards. In 2011 he set up the Bonner Yard Productions record label.

In February 2014 he announced plans to release a new album, to be preceded by an EP in March.

Discography
Now and Forever (1994), RAS
Chill (1995), Island Jamaica
Lover's Story (1998), Sweet Angel
Real Love (2001), Heartbeat
Clean Up Your Actions (2008), Clive Hunt/Ugly Man
I'm a Winner (2009), Bonner Cornerstone/VP

Compilations
Life Goes On (1990), Techniques
Greatest Hits (2001), Jet Star

References

Living people
21st-century Jamaican male singers
Jamaican dancehall musicians
People from Saint Andrew Parish, Jamaica
1959 births
20th-century Jamaican male singers
VP Records artists
Island Records artists